Gladys Thayer (also known as Gladys Thayer Reasoner) (1886–1945) was an American painter and teacher.

Life
Gladys Thayer was born in 1886 in South Woodstock, Connecticut. She was the child of artist Abbott Handerson Thayer. Thayer was a frequent model in her father's paintings, including My Children (Mary, Gerald, and Gladys Thayer) (circa 1897)---alongside her older sister Mary, and her older brother Gerald---and in the "Winged Figure" series (1904–11).

She was married to artist David Reasoner (b.1886 – d.1960). She had four children with Reasoner: Allen (1922–1943), Jean (1923– ), Margaret "Peggy" (1925–2013), Richard (1927– ).

Her father taught her how to paint. She painted flowers and portraiture. She died in 1945 in Washington, D.C.

Notable collections
"Hooded Warblers, study for book Concealing Coloration in the Animal Kingdom" - ca. 1900 – 1909, watercolor on paper, stencil, and oil on wood, Smithsonian American Art Museum

References

1886 births
1945 deaths
American women painters
20th-century American painters
People from Woodstock, Connecticut